Manuel José Tavares Fernandes (born 5 June 1951) is a Portuguese retired footballer who played as a striker, and a coach.

One of the country's most prolific goalscorers, his playing career was mainly associated with Sporting, which he later also coached. At 386 goals in all official competitions, he is the second-highest goalscorer in the club's history.

Over 19 seasons, in which he also represented two other clubs, Fernandes amassed Primeira Liga totals of 485 matches and 241 goals.

In December 2020, Sporting dedicated Gate 7 of the Estádio José Alvalade to Fernandes.

Club career

Player
Born in Sarilhos Pequenos, Moita, Setúbal District, Fernandes started his career with local Grupo Desportivo da CUF, scoring 38 goals in five years. In 1975 he got his first break, joining Primeira Liga (the only tier he competed in in a career which spanned almost two decades) club Sporting Clube de Portugal, netting more than 250 times in official matches and only trailing legendary Fernando Peyroteo who totalled over 500.

In the 1985–86 season, at the ripe age of 34/35, Fernandes produced his best individual season, scoring 30 goals – and winning the Bola de Prata – for the eventual third-placed side, behind FC Porto and S.L. Benfica. On 14 December 1986 he had arguably his finest moment as a professional, when he netted four to help to the 7–1 home demolition of Benfica.

After that season in Lisbon, Fernandes closed out his career with Vitória de Setúbal – reuniting with former Sporting teammate Rui Jordão – adding a further 16 league goals to his tally and retiring at 37. During his last campaign he notably scored against Sporting in a 2–1 home win, mere minutes after kick-off, and the Sadinos finished in a comfortable seventh place.

Manager
Fernandes began his coaching career with Setúbal in 1988, and stayed with them a further year (several other spells there would befall in the future). Then, he went on to manage several teams: C.F. Estrela da Amadora, A.D. Ovarense, S.C. Campomaiorense, F.C. Tirsense, C.D. Santa Clara, F.C. Penafiel and Atlético Sport Aviação – the Azores club would be the first from the region to play in the Portuguese top level.

With Sporting, Fernandes had already served as an assistant to England's Bobby Robson, leaving the Estádio José Alvalade after the head coach was sacked. In 2001 he had a short managerial spell with the Lions, winning the domestic Supercup before quitting his post later in the year.

In October 2009, after a successful promotion from the second division with U.D. Leiria, and having already started the following top flight campaign, Fernandes bought out his contract and returned to struggling Setúbal for a third stint, which ended on 1 March 2011.

International career
Fernandes won 31 caps for Portugal, scoring seven goals. Even though he had that stellar campaign with Sporting in 1985–86, he was excluded from the squad for the 1986 FIFA World Cup, which was marred by the Saltillo Affair.

|}

Personal life
Fernandes' son Tiago was also a footballer and is a manager.

Honours

Player
Sporting
Primeira Divisão: 1979–80, 1981–82
Taça de Portugal: 1977–78, 1981–82
Supertaça Cândido de Oliveira: 1982, 1987

Individual
Primeira Divisão Top scorer: 1985–86

Manager
Sporting
Supertaça Cândido de Oliveira: 2000

References

External links

1951 births
Living people
People from Moita
Portuguese footballers
Association football forwards
Primeira Liga players
G.D. Fabril players
Sporting CP footballers
Vitória F.C. players
Portugal under-21 international footballers
Portugal international footballers
Portuguese football managers
Primeira Liga managers
Liga Portugal 2 managers
Vitória F.C. managers
C.F. Estrela da Amadora managers
S.C. Campomaiorense managers
C.D. Santa Clara managers
Sporting CP managers
F.C. Penafiel managers
U.D. Leiria managers
Portuguese expatriate football managers
Expatriate football managers in Angola
Sportspeople from Setúbal District